Franc Breckerfeld (February 17, 1681 in Ljubljana – October 29, 1744 in  Cluj, Romania) was a Slovene theologian, mathematician, astronomer and latinist.

In his later years he was a member of the Royal Observatory at Cluj.

References

Carniolan mathematicians
Carniolan theologians
Carniolan astronomers
Carniolan philologists
1681 births
1744 deaths
Scientists from Ljubljana
Slovenian theologians
Scientists from Cluj-Napoca
Slovenian mathematicians